Thornwell-Elliott House is a historic home located at Fort Mill, York County, South Carolina. It was built about 1877, and is a one-story, "L"-shaped frame dwelling in the Late Victorian style.  The front façade features hip roofed porch with decorative brackets and turned balustrade.

It was added to the National Register of Historic Places in 1992.

References

Houses on the National Register of Historic Places in South Carolina
Victorian architecture in South Carolina
Houses completed in 1877
Houses in York County, South Carolina
National Register of Historic Places in York County, South Carolina
1877 establishments in South Carolina